Now 01 is a compilation CD released by EMI Music Australia and Warner Music Australia in 2002. It was the first of the new compilation series to replace the long running 100% Hits series. The front cover says that the album is "powered by Hot30 Countdown." A launch party was set up for the album. The album reached number 19 on the 2002 ARIA Year End Compilation Album chart and was certified platinum.

Track listing
Fat Joe featuring Ashanti and Ja Rule – "What's Luv?" (3:52)
Britney Spears – "I Love Rock 'n' Roll" (3:08)
Blue – "Fly By II" (Stargate Trilogy Mix) (3:41)
Disco Montego featuring Katie Underwood – "Beautiful" (3:42)
Scott Cain – "I'm Moving On" (3:33)
Atomic Kitten – "It's OK!" (3:20)
Michelle Branch – "All You Wanted" (3:39)
Moony – "Dove (I'll Be Loving You)" (4:03)
Brandy – "What About Us?" (4:12)
Alanis Morissette – "Hands Clean" (4:32)
Tweet featuring Missy Elliott – "Oops (Oh My)" (4:00)
Lasgo – "Something" (3:43)
Robbie Williams – "Let Love Be Your Energy" (4:07)
Daniel Bedingfield – "Gotta Get Thru This" (2:44)
Missy Elliott – "4 My People" (Basement Jaxx Radio Edit) (3:38)
Moby – "We Are All Made of Stars" (3:36)
Mis-Teeq – "B with Me" (4:19)
Alex Lloyd – "Green" (4:05)
BJ Caruana – "Dance All Night" (3:56)
P.O.D. – "Youth of the Nation" (4:16)

References

External links
 NOW 01

  	

2002 compilation albums
EMI Records compilation albums
Now That's What I Call Music! albums (Australian series)